In music, sharp, dièse (from French), or diesis (from Greek) means, "higher in pitch". More specifically, in musical notation, sharp means "higher in pitch by one semitone (half step)". Sharp is the opposite of flat, which is a lowering of pitch.

A sharp symbol, is used in key signatures or as an accidental. For instance, the music below has a key signature with three sharps (indicating either A major or F minor, the relative minor) and the note, A, has a sharp accidental.

Under twelve-tone equal temperament, B, for instance, sounds the same as, or is enharmonically equivalent to, C natural (C), and E is enharmonically equivalent to F. In other tuning systems, such enharmonic equivalences in general do not exist. To allow extended just intonation, composer Ben Johnston uses a sharp to indicate a note is raised 70.6 cents (ratio 25:24), or a flat to indicate a note is lowered 70.6 cents.

In intonation, sharp can also mean "slightly higher in pitch" (by some unspecified amount). If two simultaneous notes are slightly out-of-tune, the higher-pitched one (assuming the lower one is properly pitched) is "sharp" with respect to the other. Furthermore, the verb sharpen means to raise the pitch of a note, typically by a small musical interval.

Variants
Double sharps are indicated by the symbol  and raise a note by two semitones, or one whole tone. They should not be confused with a ghost note which is notated with "X". In modern notation the natural sign has been often omitted.

Less often (in for instance microtonal music notation) a score indicates other types of sharps. A half sharp, or demisharp raises a note by a quarter tone = 50 cents, and may be marked with various symbols including . A sharp-and-a-half, three-quarter-tone sharp, or sesquisharp, raises a note by three quarter tones = 150 cents and may be denoted .

Although very uncommon, a triple sharp can sometimes be found. It raises a note by three semitones, or a whole tone and a semitone.

Order of sharps

The order of sharps in key signature notation is F, C, G, D, A, E, B, each extra sharp being added successively in the following sequence of major keys: C→G→D→A→E→B→F→C. (These are sometimes learned using an acrostic phrase as a mnemonic, for example:   
Father Can Grab Dogs At Evenings Best   or   
Father Charles Goes Down And Ends Battle   or   
Father Christmas Gave Dad An Electric Blanket   or   
Fat Cows Go Down And Eat Buttercups   or   
Father Christmas Goes Down All Escalators Backwards.)

Similarly the order of flats is based on the same natural notes in reverse order: B, E, A, D, G, C, F 
Battle Ends And Down Goes Charles's Father or Blanket Exploded And Dad Got Cold Feet, encountered in the following series of major keys: C→F→B→E→A→D→G→C.

In the above progression, the key of C major (with seven sharps) may be more conveniently written as the harmonically equivalent key D major (with five flats), and likewise C major (with seven flats) may be more conveniently written as B major (with five sharps). Nonetheless, it is possible to extend the order of sharp keys yet further, through C→G→D→A→E→B→F→C, adding the double-sharped notes F, C, G, D, A, E and finally B, and similarly for the flat keys from C major to C major, but with progressively decreasing convenience and usage.

Correctly drawing and displaying the sharp sign

The sharp symbol resembles the number (hash) sign (#). Both signs have two sets of parallel double-lines. However, a correctly drawn sharp sign has two slanted parallel lines that rise from left to right, to avoid obscuring the staff lines. The number sign, in contrast, has two completely horizontal strokes in this place. In addition, while the sharp also always has two perfectly vertical lines, the number sign (#) may or may not contain perfectly vertical lines (according to typeface and writing style).

Unicode
In Unicode, assigned sharp signs are as follows:

See also

 Flat (music)
 Electronic tuner

Notes

References

Musical notation
Pitch (music)

fi:Etumerkki (musiikki)#Tavalliset etumerkit